Chondrothyrium is a genus of land snails with an operculum, terrestrial gastropod mollusks in the family Pomatiidae.

Species 
Species within the genus Chondrothyrium include:
Chondrothyrium alcaldei Jaume & Sánchez de Fuentes, 1943
Chondrothyrium borroi Jaume & Sánchez de Fuentes, 1943
Chondrothyrium crenimargo (Pfeiffer, 1858)
Chondrothyrium mortiarum Sánchez Roig, 1951
Chondrothyrium tejedori Sánchez Roig, 1951
Chondrothyrium torrei Jaume & Sánchez de Fuentes, 1943
Chondrothyrium violaceum (Pfeiffer, 1858)

References 

Pomatiidae